Villa Montellano is a town in the Puerto Plata province of the Dominican Republic, and formerly called Ingenio Montellano.

References

Sources 
 – World-Gazetteer.com

Municipalities of the Dominican Republic
Populated places in Puerto Plata Province